Geetham is a 1986 Malayalam film, directed by Sajan.

Cast
Mammootty as Yatheendran 
Mohanlal as Jagadeesh Nair (Guest Appearance)
Geetha as Aparna, Atheena 
Thilakan as Kesava Kurup 
Srividya as Aparna's Mother 
Master Amit
Innocent   
Mala Aravindan as Bose 
Sukumari   
Tony as Singer 
Lizy as Herself
Ranjini Haridas as child at school (uncredited)

Plot
Besides having numerous business ventures which she is a partner of, Aparna (Geetha) joins as a teacher in a non-profitable organisation, against her mother's wishes. A kid named Abhimanyu in her class grabs her attention. Later, she finds that Abhimanyu's father is a famous playwright, Yatheendran, alias Yathi (Mammootty), a man whom she once loved. Yathi's latest play titled "Aparna" was inspired by her life. Aparna treated Abhimanyu with the utmost care until a mysterious man named Jagadeesh Nair (Mohanlal), claiming to be the biological father of Abhimanyu, landed from the US to take Abhimanyu with him. Aparna learns that Abhimanyu was none other than the son of her late twin sister Atheena (Geetha), who was married to Jagadeesh.

Soundtrack
 "Aromal Hamsame" (K. J. Yesudas, Bichu Thirumala, Ravindran) 
 "Chuvaduvachu Kalikkane" (Sujatha Mohan, Bichu Thirumala, Ravindran)
 "Hei Kurumpi" (K. S. Chithra, Bichu Thirumala, Ravindran)

References

External links
 

1986 films
1980s Malayalam-language films
Films scored by Raveendran
Films scored by M. G. Radhakrishnan
Films directed by Sajan